The Unduavi gracile opossum (Cryptonanus unduaviensis) is a species of opossum in the family Didelphidae. It is native to northern Bolivia, where it has been found in seasonally flooded grassland. Some of the specimens recognized by Voss et al. as belonging to this species were previously classified as the unduaviensis or buenavistae subspecies of ''Gracilinanus agilis.

References

Opossums
Endemic fauna of Bolivia
Marsupials of South America
Mammals of Bolivia
Mammals described in 1931